Özkan Yiğiter (born 7 January 2000) is a Turkish footballer who plays as a centre-back for Gençlerbirliği on loan from Sivasspor.

Career
A youth product of Sivas Yolspor and Sivasspor, Yiğiter signed his first contract with Sivsspor in 2020. He spent the 2020-21 season on loan with Kırıkkalespor in the TFF Third League. He made his professional debut with Sivasspor in a 5–0 UEFA Europa Conference League loss to F.C. Copenhagen on 26 August 2021.

On 12 January 2023, Yiğiter joined Gençlerbirliği on loan.

Honours
Sivasspor
 Turkish Cup: 2021–22

References

External links
 
 

2000 births
Living people
Sportspeople from Sivas
Turkish footballers
Association football defenders
Sivasspor footballers
Gençlerbirliği S.K. footballers
TFF Third League players
Süper Lig players
TFF First League players